William Willard may refer to:

 William Willard (deaf educator) (1809–1881), founded Indiana's school for the deaf in Indianapolis, Indiana
 William Willard (painter) (1819–1904), American painter
  W. Willard Wirtz (William Willard Wirtz, 1912–2010),  U.S. administrator, cabinet

See also
 William Willard Ashe (1872–1932),  American forester and botanist
 William Willard Gibson Jr. (born 1932), lawyer in Texas
 William Wirtz (American football) (William Willard Wirtz Sr., 1887–1965), American football, basketball, and baseball coach